Donat Cadruvi (19 September 1923, Schluein – 1 March 1998) was a Swiss lawyer, politician and Romansh-language writer. He was a member of the Swiss National Council (1963–1971), mayor of Ilanz (1975–1978), member of the government of Graubünden (1979–1988).

External links 

1923 births
1998 deaths
Romansh people
People from Surselva District
Swiss Roman Catholics
Christian Democratic People's Party of Switzerland politicians
Members of the National Council (Switzerland)
Romansh-language writers